The Basseterre Valley is a low-lying valley on the island of Saint Kitts, surrounded by the Canada Hills and Olivees Mountain. It contains Basseterre, the capital of Saint Kitts and Nevis. The valley has two rivers or ghauts named Westbourne Ghaut and College Ghaut.

The Basseterre Valley was occupied in 1627 by the French and populated. Now, Basseterre has suburbs such as Greenlands, Bird Rock, Taylor's Range and others. The valley has a harbour called Port Zante. It is reclaimed land from the sea. Port Zante is under more construction to be a state-of-the-art port facility, duty-free shopping malls, restaurants, and maybe a hotel.

References

Landforms of Saint Kitts and Nevis